James Coyle (born 28 December 1985) is an Ireland international rugby league coach and former player.

Playing career
Coyle played for Wigan St Patricks as half back and St John Fisher pupil. In  2002 and 2003 he played in the Wigan's Academy setup and was the Senior Academy Player of the Year for 2003 Under 21s.

Coyle captained the 2003 England Academy U17s squad that beat the Australian Institute of Sport for the first time. Coyle was also selected for the 2004 Academy Origin Series.

He was included in the Wigan Warriors first team squad for the first time in 2005  his first appearance being off the bench against Hull F.C. Coyle made his full début the next weekend against Whitehaven in the Challenge Cup, and had a man-of-the-match winning performance. Coach Denis Betts commented of his performance: "James is a really good player, as he showed when he started to carry the ball and create space in the second half. He started to become the player I believe he can be."  In 2005 he was awarded Wigan Supporters' Association Under 21s Player of the Season award.

As a 19 year old in 2005 Coyle signed with the  Widnes Vikings.  where he spent a season before returning to Wigan's Academy in 2007.  Later in  2007 he moved to Oldham then on to Barrow in 2011.

Coyle was unattached and signed for the 2012 season with Championship side Workington Town on a one-year contract.  In mid 2013 he signed with Hunslet Hawks RLFC.

He moved to Whitehaven in late 2014 and retired from playing at the end of 2015.

Coaching career 
In October 2014 Coyle joined Whitehaven as caretaker coach/player. In 2015 he was appointed coach for the rest of the 2015 season. Coyle was in the shortlist of nominations for the 2015 Kingstone Press Championships and League 1 Awards for Championship Coach of the Year with Whitehaven  but was unsuccessful. Coyle announced that he would not be coaching in 2017 due to other commitments but in August 2016, with Whitehaven coming last in the competition with five wins from 25 games and in danger of relegation from Championship Shield to League 1, the Board of Directors sacked Coyle as coach. After being sacked from Whitehaven RLFC he was named as Hunslet RLFC head coach in September 2016 after Matt Bramald when his contract expired.

Personal life
Coyle's family have a long association with Wigan. Both his father Bernard Coyle, Jr. (1970's) and grandfather, Bernard Coyle, Snr. (1940s) played scrum-half for Wigan.  His younger brother, Thomas, also played for Wigan and on occasion played for the same clubs as James.

Career Statistics

References

External links
(archived by web.archive.org) Barrow Raiders profile
(archived by web.archive.org) Wigan Warriors profile

1985 births
Living people
Barrow Raiders players
English rugby league players
Hunslet R.L.F.C. coaches
Ireland national rugby league team players
Oldham R.L.F.C. players
Rugby league halfbacks
Rugby league players from Wigan
Whitehaven R.L.F.C. coaches
Widnes Vikings players
Wigan St Patricks players
Wigan Warriors players
Workington Town players